Manju (Mist) is a novel by M. T. Vasudevan Nair published in 1964. With few conversations and minimal characters the novel narrates the story of a school teacher. The novel is set in the mountains and valleys of  Nainital where Vimala Devi, a teacher in a boarding school, waits in hope for the winter of her discontent to vanish. Despite having a family comprising father, mother, sister and brother, Vimala is kept aloof from them. She hates the company of her family and enjoys solitude. The eco-feminist theme of patriarchal domination and exploitation gains more prominence in Manju, MT's only novel with a female protagonist. The novel stands apart as set in a milieu different from the usual one, the Valluvanadan village.

The plot of the novel is allegedly similar to a Hindi story Parinde (Birds, 1956), by Nirmal Verma. However both MT and Verma have rejected these claims. MT said in an interview with India Today, "I don't remember having ever read Verma's story although we are very close friends. I wrote Manju immediately after I returned from a visit to Nainital." Verma himself says it is ridiculous to accuse an author of MT's calibre of plagiarism. "My story's English translation was published only five or six years ago by HarperCollins. I don't think MT reads Hindi works in original. So there is no substance to the charge that MT had read it before he wrote his novel," says Verma.

MT also directed and scripted a film with the same name based on the novel in 1983. The film stars Sangeeta Naik, Sankar Mohan, Sankara Pillai and Nanditha Bose. The novel also had a Hindi-language film adaptation titled Sharad Sandhya. This film however went completely unnoticed.

References

1964 novels
Malayalam novels
Indian novels adapted into films
Novels set in India
Novels set in Uttarakhand
Novels set in Uttar Pradesh
Novels by M. T. Vasudevan Nair
DC Books books
1964 Indian novels